Three Forks may refer to:

 Cape Three Forks, a cape in northern Morocco
 Three Forks, Arizona, a populated place in Apache County
 Park City, Kentucky, an incorporated city in Barren Co. formerly known as Three Forks
 Three Forks, Warren County, Kentucky, an unincorporated community
 Saint Helens, Kentucky, an unincorporated community in Lee Co. also known as Three Forks
 Three Forks, Montana, a city in Gallatin County
 Three Forks (Oklahoma), a historical area around the confluence of the Arkansas, Verdigris, and Grand Rivers
 Three Forks, Oregon a populated place in Grant County, Oregon
 Three Forks (Oregon), a locale on the Owyhee River in Malheur County, Oregon
 Three Forks, Wyoming, an unincorporated community in Carbon County
 Three Forks, British Columbia, a ghost town
 Three Forks Shale

See also
Threefork Bridge, West Virginia